The Redland Whitewater Centre is a proposed, purpose-built venue for canoe slalom events at the 2032 Summer Olympics.  The preferred location is the Birkdale Community Precinct on Old Cleveland Road East in Birkdale.  Construction has not commenced.

See also

List of sports venues in Australia
Venues of the 2032 Summer Olympics and Paralympics

References

Venues of the 2032 Summer Olympics and Paralympics
Buildings and structures in Redland City
Proposed sports venues in Australia
Olympic canoeing venues